Buccochromis oculatus is a species of haplochromine cichlid. It is endemic to Lake Malawi where it is found at 18 meters depth in Malawi, Mozambique, and Tanzania. Its natural habitat is freshwater lakes. The only threat may be potential overfishing. This taxon is regarded a junior synonym of Buccochromis nototaenia by the IUCN (International Union for Conservation of Nature).

Sources

 Kazembe, J., Makocho, P. & Mailosi, A. 2005.  Buccochromis oculatus.   2006 IUCN Red List of Threatened Species.   Downloaded on 4 August 2007.

oculatus
Fish described in 1935
Taxa named by Ethelwynn Trewavas
Taxonomy articles created by Polbot
Taxobox binomials not recognized by IUCN